Research has examined whether or not there are sex differences in leadership, and these differences can be seen from a relationship based or task based perspective. Leadership is the process through which an individual guides and motivates a group towards the achievement of common goals. In studies that found a gender difference, women adopted participative styles of leadership and were more transformational leaders than men. Other studies find that no significant gender differences in leadership exist.

Until recently, leadership positions have predominantly been held by men and men were therefore stereotyped to be more effective leaders. Women were rarely seen in senior leadership positions leading to a lack of data on how they behave in such positions.  However, current research has found a change in trend and women have become more prevalent in the workforce over the past two decades, especially in management and leadership positions. The gender gap is decreasing and these stereotypes are changing as more women enter leadership roles.  The data from the primary literature on this topic is inconclusive as the two main lines of research contradict one another, the first being that there are small, but nevertheless significant sex differences in leadership and the second being that gender does not have an effect on leadership.

Studies that find gender differences
Alice Eagly, a frontrunner in the research on gender differences in leadership, found through multiple studies that differences between men and women are small and that the overlap is considerable. Nevertheless, these small differences have statistical significance in the way men and women are perceived in leadership roles and their effectiveness in such positions, as well as their leadership styles.  In early studies, from the late 1980s and early 1990s, it was found that women adopted participative styles of leadership and were more transformational leaders than men who adopted more directive and transactional styles of leadership.  Women in management positions tended to place more emphasis on communication, cooperation, affiliation, and nurturing than men as well as having more communal qualities.  Communal leadership behaviors tend to be more open, fair, pleasant and persons in these roles show responsibility. According to these studies, men were seen to be more "agentic" and be more goal and task oriented. Agentic leaders tend to be more active, task oriented, independent and focused decision makers. One of the main questions that the research has raised is if being relationship oriented or task oriented correspond to sex differences in leadership, where, women are likely to be more relationship oriented and men are likely to be more task oriented.

Recent studies conducted by Trinidad and Normure in 2005, Yukl in 2002, and a study conducted by Hagberg Consulting Group in 2000 found a similar trend the leadership behaviors of men and women .  Specifically according to Yukl, women have a "feminine advantage" because they are "more adept at being inclusive, interpersonally sensitive, and nurturing."  The study conducted by Hagberg Consulting Group also found women managers to be ranked higher in 42 out of 52 traits and skills measured, including teamwork,  stability, motivation, recognizing trends, and acting on new ideas. Women tend connect more with their group members by exhibiting behaviors such as smiling more, maintaining eye, and are more diplomatic with their comments (Forsyth, 2010). The differences between men and women may suggest evolutionary stressors that have contributed to the development of these relationship and task oriented tendencies between men and women. Another explanation, proposed by Eagly and Carli (2007), attributes many of these findings not to average gender differences per se, but to a "selection effect" caused by gender bias and discrimination against women, whereby easier standards for men in attaining leadership positions as well as the fact that men make up the majority of executives results in a higher average of exceptionally skilled women than men in some leader roles. Women tend to feel more excluded from career related and informal interactions with the senior management compared to men. In fact, the term "glass ceiling" can be used to describe the hindrance women face in career advancement to top management positions. The tendency of men to dominate women in informal discussion groups has been observed in a number of scenarios including when both sexes were deemed to be androgynous, when group members were committed to equality of sexes, when women were more dispositionally dominant than men, and when both sexes were extroverted. Furthermore, it has been observed that the dispositionally dominant person is more likely to emerge as a leader in same-sex dyads, but in mixed-dyads, the dominant male is more likely to emerge as leader compared to a dominant female.

A similar study conducted by the Management Research Group of 17,491 questionnaires found that out of common leadership competency areas surveyed, women were rated higher by their superiors in areas like credibility with management, future potential, insight, sensitivity, and working with diverse people. Men were ranked higher in business aptitude, financial understanding, and strategic planning, which the researchers note are seen to be critical to corporate advancement. No gender differences were found in competencies such as team performance, effective thinking, and willingness to listen and no differences were found in overall effectiveness.

However, many of these studies on gender differences in leadership style rely on leader-only self-report data, which many leadership scholars describe as unreliable at best. These sex differences are only trends and may not be seen across all groups and situations. It would be very difficult to determine how men and women would behave once they become leaders. Additionally, though relationship orientation in women and agentic orientation in men has been observed in laboratory settings, they have not been seen in studies conducted in organizational settings

Differences in perception
When studying perception and effectiveness of men and women in leadership, in multiple studies, it was  found that men and women are perceived better by subordinates and are seen as more effective leaders when in positions in accordance to traditional gender roles.  In a study conducted in 1990, it was found that women "lose authority... if they employ feminine styles of leadership in male-dominated roles."  A meta-analysis conducted later yielded similar results in which men and women are both perceived as more effective leaders in stereotypical roles and both are found ineffective in non-traditional roles. Female leaders are perceived as less dominant than male leaders by their subordinates. Furthermore, a single male in a group is more likely to assume leadership than a single female in a group, who is likely to have less influence over the group members. Members of the group are more likely to agree with a male leader when power is exerted than a female leader. However, in a study conducted by Shelby et al. (2010), female leadership advantage was investigated by specifying contextual factors that moderate the likelihood that such an advantage would emerge. These authors considered if female gender role and the leader role were incongruent and led to a disadvantage or if instead, an advantage. They conducted two studies and found that only when success was seen as internal that top women leaders were considered more agentic and more communal than top men leaders. They also found that the effect on agentic attributes were mediated by perceptions of double standards, while communal traits were mediated by expectations of feminized management skills. This particular study showed the presence of qualified female leader advantage.

Even though women exhibit many effective leadership qualities in some studies, men still assume far more leadership positions and are more likely to be seen as leaders

Studies that do not find gender differences
In contradiction to Eagly's findings of gender differences in leadership, multiple studies have also claimed that there are no significant differences and that both men and women can and will have differing and similar styles of leadership.

A 2014 meta-analysis including 99 independent samples across 95 studies found that men and women do not significantly differ in leadership effectiveness when all contexts are considered.

In 2011, Andersen and Hansson conducted a study to determine if there were significant differences in leadership behaviors as claimed by previous studies and authors.  Andersen and Hansen studied public managers on leadership styles, decision-making styles, and motivation profiles and found that the only differences were in decision-making styles, but none were great enough to be considered significant.

Additionally, in a 2010 study, men and women leaders in a large German sample were found to be the same with respect to transformational leadership behavior.

Cliff (2005) studied male and female business owners, who are free to manage as they see fit, as opposed to middle managers who are more constrained, and found that no significant differences exist in men and women's leadership behavior. According to the researchers, the findings "challenge the gender-stereotypic argument that a leader's sex plays an important role when it comes to organizational design and management."

Another similar study Dobbins and Platz (1986) found that even men and women show equal amounts of relationship orientation and task orientation and have equally satisfied subordinates. Even though male leaders are rated as more effective than female leaders, these findings are based on laboratory research and may not hold in organizational settings.

These studies correlate with other research cited by Vecchio (2002), Dobbins and Platt (1986), Gibson (1995), and van Engen et al. (2001), who all argue that no significant gender differences in leadership exist.

Preference for a boss
Women and men have been surveyed by Gallup each year concerning workplace topics, and when questioned about preferences of a female boss or a male boss, women chose a preference for a male boss 39% of the time, compared to 26% of men displaying preference for a male boss.  Only 27% of females would prefer a boss of the same gender.  This preference, among both sexes, for male leadership in the workplace has continued unabated for sixty years, according to the survey results.

References

Bibliography

Eagly, A. & Carli, L. (2007). Through the labyrinth: the truth about how women become leaders. Boston, MA:  Harvard Business School Press
Kinicki, A. & Williams, B. (2009). Management: A practical introduction (4th ed.). Boston, MA: McGraw-Hill Irwin
Levy, P. (2010). Industrial organizational psychology: Understanding the workplace (3rd ed.). New York: NY: Worth Publishers

Leadership
Gender equality
Leadership